Maghrebi script or Maghribi script refers to a loosely related family of Arabic scripts that developed in the Maghreb (North Africa), al-Andalus (Iberia), and Bilad as-Sudan (the West African Sahel). Maghrebi script is directly derived from the Kufic script, and is traditionally written with a pointed tip, producing a line of even thickness.

The script is characterized by rounded letter forms, extended horizontal features, and final open curves below the baseline. It also differs from Mashreqi scripts in the notation of the letters faa and qoph.

For centuries, Maghrebi script was used to write Arabic manuscripts and record Andalusi and Moroccan literature, whether in Classical Arabic,  Maghrebi Arabic, or Amazigh languages.

History

Origins 
Arabic script first came to the Maghreb with the Islamic conquests (643–709). The conquerors, led by Uqba ibn Nafi, used both Hijazi and Kufic scripts, as demonstrated in coins minted in 711 under Musa ibn Nusayr. Maghrebi script is a direct descendant of the old Kufic script that predated Ibn Muqla's al-khat al-mansub ( proportioned line) standardization reforms, which affected Mashreqi scripts. The Arabic script in its Iraqi Kufic form spread from centers such as Fes, Cordoba, and Qairawan throughout the region along with Islam, as the Quran was studied and transcribed. Qayrawani Kufic script developed in al-Qayrawan from the Iraqi Kufic script.

African and Andalusi scripts 

Early on, there were two schools of Maghrebi script: the African script and the Andalusi script. The African script evolved in Ifriqiya (Tunisia) from Iraqi Kufic by way of the Kufic of Qairawan. The Andalusi script evolved in Iberia from the Damascene Kufic script with the establishment of the second Umayyad state, which would become the Caliphate of Córdoba. The Andalusi script was particular for its rounded letters, as attested to in Al-Maqdisi's geography book The Best Divisions in the Knowledge of the Regions. The African script had spread throughout the Maghreb before the spread of the Andalusi script. One of the most famous early users of the Arabic script was Salih ibn Tarif, the leader of the Barghawata Confederacy and the author of a religious text known as the Quran of Salih.

In  ('the Far West', Morocco), the script developed independently from the Kufic of the Maghrawa and Bani Ifran under the Idrisid dynasty (788–974); it gained Mashreqi features under the Imam Idris I, who came from Arabia. The script under the Idrisids was basic and unembellished; it was influenced by Iraqi Kufic, which was used on the Idrisid dirham.

Imperial patronage

Almoravid 

Under the Almoravid dynasty, the Andalusi script spread throughout the Maghreb, reaching Qairawan; the Jerīd region, however, kept the African script. A version of Kufic with florid features developed at this time. The University of al-Qarawiyyin, the Almoravid Qubba, and the Almoravid Minbar bear examples of Almoravid Kufic.

The Kufic script of the Almoravid dinar was imitated in a maravedí issued by Alfonso VIII of Castile.

The minbar of the al-Qarawiyyin Mosque, created in 1144, was the "last major testament of Almoravid patronage," and features what is now called Maghrebi thuluth, an interpretation of Eastern thuluth and diwani traditions.

Almohad 

Under the Almohad dynasty, Arabic calligraphy continued to flourish and a variety of distinct styles developed. The Almohad caliphs, many of whom were themselves interested in Arabic script, sponsored professional calligraphers, inviting Andalusi scribes and calligraphers to settle in Marrakesh, Fes, Ceuta, and Rabat. The Almohad caliph Abu Hafs Umar al-Murtada established the first public manuscript transcription center at the madrasa of his mosque in Marrakesh (now the Ben Youssef Madrasa).

The Maghrebi thuluth script was appropriated and adopted as an official "dynastic brand" used in different media, from manuscripts to coinage to fabrics. The Almohads also illuminated certain words or phrases for emphasis with gold leaf and lapis lazuli.

For centuries, the Maghrebi script was used to write Arabic manuscripts that were traded throughout the Maghreb.

Nasrid 
In the Emirate of Granada under the Nasrid dynasty, and particularly under Yusuf I and Muhammad V, Arabic epigraphy further developed. Kufic inscriptions developed extended vertical strokes forming ribbon-like decorative knots. Kufic script also had "an enormous influence on the decorative and graphic aspects of Christian art."

Aljamiado 

In Iberia, the Arabic script was used to write Romance languages such as Mozarabic, Portuguese, Spanish or Ladino. This writing system was referred to as Aljamiado, from ʿajamiyah.

Fesi Andalusi script 

Waves of migration from Iberia throughout the history of al-Andalus impacted writing styles in North Africa. Ibn Khaldun noted that the Andalusi script further developed under the Marinid dynasty (1244–1465), when Fes received Andalusi refugees. In addition to Fes, the script flourished in cities such as Ceuta, Taza, Meknes, Salé, and Marrakesh, although the script experienced a regression in rural areas far from the centers of power. The Fesi script spread throughout much of the Islamic west.  gives the exception of the region around Algiers, which was more influenced by the African script of Tunisia.  noted that Maghrebi script essentially reached its final form during the Marinid period, as it became independent of the Andalusi script. There were three forms of Maghrebi script in use: one in urban centers such as those previously mentioned, one in rural areas used to write in both Arabic and Amazigh, and one that preserved Andalusi features. Maghrebi script was also divided into different varieties: Kufic, mabsūt, mujawhar, Maghrebi thuluth, and musnad (z'mami).

Saadi reforms 
The reforms in the Saadi period (1549–1659) affected manuscript culture and calligraphy. Sultan Ahmad al-Mansur himself was proficient in Maghrebi thuluth, and even invented a secret script for his private correspondences. Decorative scripts flourished under the Saadi dynasty and were used in architecture, manuscripts, and coinage.

Alawi era 

Maghrebi script was supported by the 17th-century Alawite sultans Al-Rashid and Ismail. Under the reign of Sultan Muhammad III, the script devolved into an unrefined, illegible badawi script associated with rural areas. Under Sultan Suleiman, the script improved in urban areas and particularly in the capital Meknes. Meanwhile, Rabat and Salé preserved some features of Andalusi script, and some rural areas such as Dukāla, Beni Zied, and al-Akhmas excelled in the Maghrebi script.

The script quality then regressed again, which led Ahmed ibn Qassim ar-Rifā'ī ar-Ribātī to start a script reform and standardization movement as Ibn Muqla and Ibn al-Bawwab had done in the Mashriq. He authored Stringing the Pearls of the Thread, a book in the form of an urjuza on the rules of Maghrebi script.

Muhammad Bin Al-Qasim al-Qundusi, active in Fes from 1828–1861, innovated a unique style known as al-Khatt al-Qundusi.

After  introduced the first Arabic lithographic printing press to Morocco in 1864, the mujawher variety of the Maghrebi script became the standard for printing body text, although other varieties were also used.

Colonial period 

The French Protectorate in Morocco represented a crisis for Maghrebi script, as Latin script became dominant in education and public life, and the Moroccan Nationalist Movement fought to preserve Maghrebi script in response. In 1949, Muhammad bin al-Hussein as-Sūsī and Antonio García Jaén published Ta'līm al-Khatt al-Maghrebi a series of five booklets teaching Maghrebi script printed in Spain.

Additionally, books from the Mashreq printed in naskh scripts were imported for use in schools and universities, and handwriting began to be taught with mashreqi letter forms.

Post-independence 
In the period after independence, there were a number of initiatives to modernize Arabic script to suit the typewriter, prominent among which was that of the Moroccan linguist  of the Institute for Studies and Research on Arabization: Standard Arabic Script.

Recently 
In 2007, Muḥammad al-Maghrāwī and  cowrote Maghrebi Script: History, Present, and Horizons.

In early 2020, the President of Tunisia, Kais Saied, garnered significant media attention for his handwritten official letters in the Maghrebi script.

Variations 
In the book al-Khat al-Maghrebi, five main subscripts of Maghrebi script are identified:

 Maghrebi Kufic variations of Kufic script used in the Maghreb and al-Andalus. 
Almoravid Kufic a decorative script that does not receive Arabic diacritics. It was used in coin minting and is usually accompanied by fine floral designs. The Almoravid minbar of the Kutubiyya Mosque in Marrakesh features a fine example.
Almohad Kufic
Marinid Kufic
Alawite Kufic
Qayrawani Kufic
Pseudo Kufic
Mabsout script, used for body text and to write the Quran, similar in usage to the eastern Naskh.
Andalusi Mabsout
Saadi Mabsout
Alawite Mabsout
Mujawher cursive script, mainly used by the king to announce laws. This is the script that was used for body text when lithographic prints started to be produced in Fes.
Thuluth Maghrebi script, formerly called Mashreqi (مشرقي) or Maghrebized Mashreqi (مشرقي متمغرب) a script inspired by the Mashreqi Thuluth script. It is mainly used as a decorative script for book titles and walls in mosques. It was used as an official script by the Almohads. 
Musnad script, or Z'mami script, a cursive script mainly used by courts and notaries in writing marriage contracts. This script is derived from Mujawher, and its letters in this script lean to the right. Because is difficult to read, this script was used to write texts that the author wanted to keep obscure, such as texts about sorcery.

In addition, Muhammad Bin Al-Qasim al-Qundusi, a 19th-century Sufi calligrapher based in Fes, developed a flamboyant style now known as Qandusi script.

In 1886, he identified 4 main subscripts within the Maghrebi script family:

Qairawani—"smooth and even"
 Andalusi—"small, compact, and jerky"
Fasi—"large, round, and elegant"
Sudani—"thicker and blacker"

West African Maghrebi scripts 

Various West African Arabic scripts, also called Sudani scripts (in reference to Bilad as-Sudan), also fall under the category of Maghrebi scripts, including:

Suqi named after the town of Suq, though also used in Timbuktu. It is associated with the Tuareg people.
Fulani
Hausawi
Mauretanian Baydani
Kanemi  or Kanawi, is associated with the region of Kano in modern-day Chad and northern Nigeria, associated with Borno—also Barnawi script
Saharan

Contrast with Mashreqi scripts 

One of the prominent ways Maghrebi scripts differ from scripts of the Arabic-speaking East is the dotting of the letters faa and qoph. In eastern tradition, the faa is represented by a circle with a dot above, while in Maghrebi scripts the dot goes below the circle. In eastern scripts, the qoph is represented by a circle with two dots above it, whereas the Maghrebi qoph is a circle with just one dot above, similar to the eastern faa. In fact, concerns over the preservation of Maghrebi writing traditions played a part in the reservations of the Moroccan ulama's against importing the printing press.

Additionally, Nico van den Boogert notes that in Maghrebi script:

 the loop of Ṣād and Ḍādhas no "tooth"
 the stems of alif, lam, lamalif, Ṭāʾ, and Ẓāʾ are drawn with a knot at the end
 the stems of Ṭāʾ, and Ẓāʾ are drawn diagonally
 the final alif is written top-to-bottom
 the final and isolated dāl and dhāl resemble initial and medial Kaph
Additionally, Maghrebi scripts differ from Mashreqi scripts in that Maghrebi scripts are traditionally written with a pointed tip instead of a chisel tip. As a result, Maghrebi scripts typically have less contrast in line thickness than Mashreqi scripts, which have wider horizontal strokes and thinner vertical strokes.

Gallery

See also

 Rashi script
 Tifinagh

References

O. Houdas, "Essai sur l'écriture maghrebine", in Nouveaux mélanges orientaux, IIe série vol. xix., Publications des Langues Vivantes Orientales (Paris 1886)
N. van den Boogert, on the origin of Maghribi script

External links

Arabic article
Example of a Quran in Maghrebi script

Arabic calligraphy
Islamic culture
Maghrebi Arabic
Moroccan culture
Algerian culture
Tunisian culture
Malian culture